Gary Steven Roenicke (born December 5, 1954) is a former Major League Baseball outfielder for the Montreal Expos (1976), Baltimore Orioles (1978–85), New York Yankees (1986) and Atlanta Braves (1987–88).

Early career
He was originally drafted by the Montreal Expos as the eighth pick of the first round of the 1973 amateur draft. He earned the MVP Award in the Eastern League in 1975. A year later, he made his major league debut for the Montreal Expos, hitting .222 in 29 games with two home runs and five runs batted in.

Oriole career
Roenicke was acquired along with Don Stanhouse and Joe Kerrigan by the Baltimore Orioles from the Expos for Rudy May, Randy Miller and Bryn Smith at the Winter Meetings on December 7, 1977.

Roenicke appeared in 27 games in his first season with the Orioles in 1978. A year later, in his first full season, he had perhaps the best season of his career, appearing in 133 games and hitting .261 with 25 home runs and 64 runs batted in. He even made the top ten in at-bats per home run, with one home run every 15.0 AB. The next year, he hit .239 with 10 home runs, 28 runs batted in. In 1981 he hit .269, but his power numbers were still significantly down, slugging only .384, whereas he had slugged .508 in his rookie season. In 1982, he hit .270 with a slugging percentage of .499 in 137 games, platooning with John Lowenstein and Benny Ayala. In 1984, he hit a grand slam during the Home Run Derby jackpot inning of a locally televised game against the Yankees, which resulted in a $1 million jackpot award to a Maryland viewer.

Decline
Roenicke never established numbers like the 1982 season or rookie season. A year later, both his average and slugging were down and after two more years, the Orioles traded him to the New York Yankees for Rex Hudler. On the Yankees, his role was limited to a bench player and his power was down, with three home runs. He signed as a free agent in 1986 by the Atlanta Braves for less than half the amount of money he had been making ($380,000). He continued his career on the bench, this year doing better in the power department, hitting nine home runs. The next year, he hit .228 with a .298 slugging percentage, the worst of his career. He was released by the Braves on July 26, 1988 and retired.

Post-playing career
Roenicke resides in Rough and Ready, California, and is currently an adviser for the Western Canadian Baseball League, as well as a scout for the Orioles. His brother, Ron, had an eight-year career as an outfielder in the 1980s while his son Josh was a member of both the UCLA football and baseball teams as a wide receiver and outfielder. On the UCLA Bruins, Josh had the second-highest on-base percentage, third-highest batting average and compiled a perfect fielding percentage. Josh was drafted by the Cincinnati Reds, made his major-league baseball debut with the Reds as a pitcher on September 13, 2008, and on July 31, 2009 was traded to the Toronto Blue Jays.

References

External links

Gary Roenicke at SABR (Baseball BioProject)
 Gary Roenicke at Baseballbiography.com
 Wulf, Steve. "It's The Right Idea For Left," Sports Illustrated, July 12, 1982.
 Klingaman, Mike. "Catching Up With...former Oriole Gary Roenicke," The Toy Department (The Baltimore Sun sports blog), Tuesday, July 7, 2009.

1954 births
Living people
American expatriate baseball players in Canada
Atlanta Braves players
Baltimore Orioles players
Baltimore Orioles scouts
Baseball players from California
Denver Bears players
Jamestown Expos players
Major League Baseball left fielders
Montreal Expos players
New York Yankees players
People from Greater Los Angeles
People from the San Gabriel Valley
Québec Carnavals players
Rochester Red Wings players
San Bernardino Pride players
San Diego Padres scouts
West Palm Beach Expos players
People from Covina, California